The American Numismatic Association (ANA) is an organization founded in 1891 by George Francis Heath. Located in Colorado Springs, Colorado, it was formed to advance the knowledge of numismatics (the study of coins) along educational, historical, and scientific lines, as well as to enhance interest in the hobby.

The ANA has more than 24,000 individual members who receive many benefits, such as discounts, access to website features, and the monthly journal The Numismatist. The ANA's Colorado Springs headquarters houses its administrative offices, library, and money museum. The ANA received a federal charter from the United States Congress in 1912.

A board of governors is in charge of the ANA. Numerous advisory committees help to operate it properly. The ANA has a Young Numismatists program intended to promote interest among youth. The ANA has held annual conventions throughout the nation in most years since 1891, with two per year since 1978. The Chester L. Krause Memorial Distinguished Service Award is bestowed upon the most dedicated members. The ANA also maintains a Numismatic Hall of Fame.

History
Dr. George F. Heath of Monroe, Michigan, gained knowledge of world history by studying his collection of coins. The obscurity of his community was an obstacle towards obtaining certain specimens, and made meeting fellow numismatists difficult. In 1888, he printed, published and distributed a four-page leaflet, NUMISMATIST, in which he listed his coin needs, advertised duplicates for sale, and discussed numismatic topics.

The nascent publication found many friends among other isolated collectors. As Heath's subscription list increased, a need for a national organization of numismatists was evident. The February 1891 edition of The Numismatist printed a question, "What is the matter with having an American Numismatic Association?" A follow-up statement was included: "There is nothing like the alliance of kindred pursuits to stimulate growth and interest."

On October 7 and October 8, 1891, five men—Heath, William G. Jerrems, David Harlowe, J.A. Heckelman and John Brydon—holding 26 proxies, met in Chicago with 61 charter members. The result was the founding of the ANA, which has since become the largest non-profit numismatic organization in the world. Heath then introduced the idea of a numismatic convention, where members could make personal contact with other numismatists. The first convention was held in 1891, then annually until 1895, and then in 1901 and 1904. After the 1907 convention in Columbus, Ohio, it was decided to hold annual conventions thereafter.

On June 16, 1908, Dr. Heath suddenly died. Farran Zerbe, then president, assumed the task of editing and publishing The Numismatist, and soon purchased the publication from Heath's heirs. In 1911, W.C.C. Wilson of Montreal, Quebec, Canada, purchased The Numismatist from Zerbe and presented it to the ANA. Since then, the magazine has been owned and published monthly by the ANA.

On May 9, 1912, the ANA attained national prominence as it was granted a Federal Charter signed by President William Howard Taft. In 1962, an amendment to make the Charter permanent and allow for a larger Board was introduced and passed by Congress and signed into law by John F. Kennedy on April 10. The amendment was presented by Congressman Wilbur Mills and Senator John L. McClellan, both of Arkansas.

An ANA national headquarters building fund was established on April 29, 1961. A site in Colorado Springs, Colorado was selected as the headquarter's location and a ground breaking ceremony was held on September 6, 1966. On December 20, the $250,000 building fund goal was reached and the new headquarters was dedicated and officially opened on June 10, 1967.

Headquarters
The ANA's administration operates from its Colorado Springs headquarters. The ANA's monthly journal, The Numismatist, is produced here; its editor-in-chief is Caleb Noel. Many articles are contributed by ANA members. The facility houses the largest circulating numismatic library in the world. Books, educational slide programs and instructional videotapes are loaned to members without charge other than costs to cover postage and insurance. The ANA has many affiliate club members throughout the United States, such as the Beverly Hills Coin Club and the Chicago Coin Club.

ANA headquarters contains the ANA Money Museum, which includes over 250,000 objects encompassing the history of numismatics from the earliest invention of money to modern day. 

The Harry W. Bass Collection, a feature of the museum from 2000-2022, featured American gold coins, experimental pattern coins and paper money. The collection includes a complete set of three dollar gold coins, including the unique 1870-S specimen, a complete type set of U.S. gold coin designs from 1834 to 1933, and a collection of pattern coins from the United States Mint. In April 2022, the museum announced that the foundation was auctioning off the collection, with the proceeds going to various Dallas-area charities.

The museum also offers changing exhibits about money in history, art, archeology, banking and economics, and coin collecting. Members may study the items on display and, by prearrangement, can use other museum materials for research purposes.

Membership
The ANA has nearly 24,000 individual members. Memberships last one year, three years, five years, or a lifetime. The cost of the latter differs, depending on a member's age and whether the ANA's magazine, The Numismatist, is mailed or read digitally. Membership is classified into five levels: silver, gold, or platinum, with a "life membership" option available for a one-time payment, and a youth option for kids under 18.

Board of governors
The ANA is run by a nine-member board of governors composed of the President, Vice-President, and seven Governors, each elected by ANA members in odd-numbered years. Governor candidates must have been ANA members for at least three years. President and Vice President candidates must have served at least one term as a Governor. Total service on the Board is limited to 10 years.

The incumbent board of governors was elected in 2021. The election results were as follows:

List of ANA presidents

William G. Jerrems Jr., 1891–1892
George F. Heath, 1892–1894
August G. Heaton, 1894–1899
Joseph Hooper, 1899–1902
Benjamin P. Wright, 1902–1905
Albert R. Frey, 1905–1908
Farran Zerbe, 1908–1910
John M. Henderson, 1910–1912
Judson P. Brenner, 1912–1914
Frank G. Duffield, 1914–1915
Henry O. Granberg, 1915–1917
Carl Wurtzbach, 1917–1919
Waldo C. Moore, 1919–1921
Moritz Wormser, 1921–1926
Harry H. Yawger, 1926–1927
Charles Markus, 1927–1930
George J. Bauer, 1930–1932
Alden Scott Boyer, 1932–1933
Nelson T. Thorson, 1933–1935
T. James Clarke, 1935–1937
J. Henri Ripstra, 1937–1939
L.W. Hoffecker, 1939–1941
J. Douglas Ferguson, 1941–1943
Martin F. Kortjohn, 1943–1945
V. Leon Belt, 1945–1947
Loyd B. Gettys, 1947–1949
M. Vernon Sheldon, 1949–1951
Joseph Moss, 1951–1953
J. Hewitt Judd, 1953–1955
Leonel C. Panosh, 1955–1957
Oscar H. Dodson, 1957–1961
C.C. Tim Shroyer, 1961–1963
Paul K. Anderson, 1963–1965
Matt H. Rothert, 1965–1967
Arthur Sipe, 1967–1969
Herbert M. Bergen, 1969–1971
John J. Pittman, 1971–1973
Virginia Culver, 1973–1975
Virgil Hancock, 1975–1977
Grover C. Criswell, Jr., 1977–1979
George D. Hatie, 1979–1981
Adna G. Wilde, Jr., 1981–1983
Q. David Bowers, 1983–1985
Florence M. Schook, 1985–1987
Stephen R. Taylor, 1987–1989
Kenneth L. Hallenbeck, Jr., 1989–1991
Edward C. Rochette, 1991–1993
David L. Ganz, 1993–1995
Kenneth Bressett, 1995–1997
Anthony Swiatek, 1997–1999
H. Robert Campbell, 1999–2001
John Wilson, 2001–2003
Gary E. Lewis, 2003–2005
William Horton, 2005–2007
Barry Stuppler, 2007–2009
Clifford Mishler, 2009–2011
Tom Hallenbeck, 2011–2013
Walter Ostromecki, 2013–2015
Jeff Garrett, 2015–2017
Gary Adkins, 2017-2019
Col. Steven K. Ellsworth, Ret., 2019–2021
Dr. Ralph Ross 2021-present

– Sources:

Advisory committees
The ANA is also served by various advisory committees. There are temporary advisory committees for searches, and one formed for forming a Strategic Vision for the board in 2012. There are several more permanent advisory committees.

Young Numismatists
The ANA has many programs for Young Numismatists (YNs). There are currently three programs in which YNs can earn free coins by completing coin-related activities. These programs are the Early American Copper Project, the David R. Cervin Ancient Coin Project, and The Dollar Project. Another program, Coins For A's, allows kids to get free coins, plus a basic-level ANA membership by getting A's in school. The ANA also has a YN Dollars program in which YNs earn YN Dollars for different activities. They can spend these YN Dollars at the ANA Summer Convention at the annual YN auction. The Young Numismatist of the Year award has been given by the ANA every year since 1968. Many former winners of the award are now prominent numismatic professionals, or have distinguished themselves in other areas.

The Young Numismatists of America (YNA) was a worldwide coin organization founded in 1990 at the ANA Summer Seminar. In its early days, the YNA was an attractive way for young numismatists (YNs) to submit articles for publication. However, by late 1996, many of the YNA founders were in college and could no longer help out. The YNA slowly faded away because of lack of interest. In 2001 at the ANA Summer Seminar, the young collectors decided to reform YNA. Within several years, the YNA once again ceased to exist.

Events
The ANA has held conventions annually most years since 1891, and expanded to two annual shows in 1978. The ANA offered a third show in 2011 and 2012, but announced on May 4, 2012 that it will not continue this in 2013. The features of these conventions include the offering of a large bourse room, along with exhibits, educational programs, junior member activities, auctions, and meetings of affiliated specialty organizations. The National Money Show and the ANA World's Fair of Money are the brands for shows that have been held on an Annual Basis by the ANA. The National Money Show is traditionally held in the Spring while the World's Fair is held in the Summer. The Fall shows in 2011 and 2012 also used the National Money Show brand.

The annual ANA Summer Seminar is an assortment of classes held in Colorado Springs mid-summer (generally the last week of June and first week of July). Most classes are one week long but some weeks have half-week classes available. Classes are taught by numismatic experts. Students are of all ages and divided between collectors and numismatic professionals. There are special programs for Young Numismatists. The ANA and many local coin clubs sponsor a few scholarships to defer some costs for a few students.

Convention locations

Locations for the ANA Conventions.

Chester L. Krause Memorial Distinguished Service Award
The ANA Distinguished Service Award, (formerly the Farran Zerbe Memorial Award) is the highest honor conferred by the ANA. It is given in recognition of numerous years of outstanding, dedicated service to numismatics. The criteria for the nominee should be that the individual is considered someone who has rendered numerous years of outstanding service to the ANA as well as the field of numismatics. An additional qualification is that the nominee should be a former Medal of Merit and Glenn Smedley Memorial Award recipient. The award is limited only to members of the ANA.

For a list of winners, please see Chester L. Krause Memorial Distinguished Service Award

Hall of Fame
To enshrine the most important numismatists of all time, the ANA established the Numismatic Hall of Fame at its Colorado Springs headquarters in 1964. The Hall's constitution and bylaws were drafted that year, and the first inductees enshrined in 1969 and the next group in 1970, with subsequent honorees inducted every two years thereafter. The Hall was the brainchild of Jack W. Ogilvie, a Hollywood film writer and editor who served as ANA historian from 1950 to 1970.

Prior to each induction year, nominations are accepted from the membership. After review by a five-member Hall of Fame council, the names and qualifications of the nominees are passed on to a 25-member elector panel. Candidates receiving 13 or more votes are inducted; those receiving six to 12 votes are reconsidered in the next election. Members of the council, the ANA board of governors, and ANA appointed officers and staff are ineligible to serve as electors.

The nominees are considered in alternating annual cycles. "Historic Era" nominees (deceased more than 25 years prior to induction) are considered in odd numbered years, and "Modern Era" nominees (living or deceased less than 25 years) are considered in even-numbered years.

Inductees by year

References

External links

American Numismatic Association

Organizations based in Colorado Springs, Colorado
Nonprofit hobbyist organizations based in the United States
Organizations established in 1891
1891 establishments in Illinois